Decorospora is a fungal genus.  Currently, it is monotypic, and contains only the marine species, Decorospora gaudefroyi.

Species 
 Decorospora gaudefroyi (Pat.) Inderbitzin, Kohlm. & Volkm.-Kohlm, formerly Pleospora gaudefroyi, Patouillard

References 
 Decorospora, a new genus for the marine ascomycete Pleospora gaudefroyi

Pleosporaceae
Monotypic Dothideomycetes genera